Selectfluor, a trademark of Air Products and Chemicals, is a reagent in chemistry that is used as a fluorine donor. This compound is a derivative of the nucleophillic base DABCO. It is a colourless salt that tolerates air and even water. It has been commercialized for use for electrophilic fluorination.

Preparation
Selectfluor is synthesized by the N-alkylation of diazabicyclo[2.2.2]octane (DABCO) with dichloromethane, followed by ion exchange with sodium tetrafluoroborate (replacing the chloride counterion for the tetrafluoroborate). The resulting salt is treated with elemental fluorine and sodium tetrafluoroborate:

Mechanism of fluorination
Electrophilic fluorinating reagents could in principle operate by electron transfer pathways or an SN2 attack at fluorine. This distinction has not been decided. By using a charge-spin separated probe, it was possible to show that the electrophilic fluorination of stilbenes with Selectfluor proceeds through an SET/fluorine atom transfer mechanism.

In certain cases Selectfluor can transfer fluorine to alkyl radicals.

Applications
The conventional source of "electrophilic fluorine", i.e. the equivalent to  the superelectrophile F+, is gaseous fluorine, which requires specialised equipment for manipulation.  Selectfluor reagent is a salt, the use of which requires only routine procedures. Like F2, the salt delivers the equivalent of F+.  It is mainly used in the synthesis of organofluorine compounds:

Specialized applications
Selectfluor reagent also serves as a strong oxidant, a property that is useful in other reactions in organic chemistry.  Oxidation of alcohols and phenols.  As applied to electrophilic iodination, Selectfluor reagent activates the I–I bond in I2 molecule.

References

Patents 
 
 
 
 
 

Reagents for organic chemistry
Tetrafluoroborates
Fluorinating agents
Quaternary ammonium compounds
Nitrogen heterocycles
Organochlorides
Substances discovered in the 1990s